Anno Saul (born 14 November 1963) is a German screenwriter and film director.

Biography 
Born in Bonn, West Germany, the son of a physician, Saul studied at the Peter-Joerres-Gymnasium in Bad Neuenahr-Ahrweiler and afterwards, graduating from the Munich School of Philosophy, and then, from 1985 to 1990, filmed a feature film at the University of Television and Film Munich. In 1987, he created a Bayerischer Rundfunk teleplay.

In 1991, Saul received the Max Ophüls film festival prize with the film Unter Freunden. After several television films, he filmed his feature film debut, Grüne Wüste ("Green Desert"), in 1998 with Martina Gedeck. After his television film Novizin, he directed his second feature film, Kebab Connection, based on a book by Fatih Akin, Ruth Thoma and Jan Berger. In 2006, he directed the movie Where Is Fred? with Til Schweiger, Jürgen Vogel, Christoph Maria Herbst, and Alexandra Maria Lara. This was followed in 2009 by the mystery thriller The Door with Mads Mikkelsen, Jessica Schwarz, and Thomas Thieme. In 2013, he also directed the comedy Therapy Crashers with Marie Bäumer, Milan Peschel, Fahri Yardım, and Josefine Preuß.

Saul was a lecturer at the Internationale Filmschule Köln. Since 2010, he has been a full member of the board of directors of the Deutsche Filmakademie in the field of directing. He lives in Berlin.

Awards 
 1991: Max-Ophüls-Preis for Unter Freunden
 Publikumspreis at the Cinequest Film Festival in San Jose, California, United States, for Grüne Wüste
 2010: Hauptpreis "Best Picture" at the Tromsø Int. Film Festival for The Door
 2010: "Le Grand Prix" at the Festival international du film fantastique de Gérardmer for The Door
 2010: The "Silver Melias" at the Brussels International Fantastic Film Festival for The Door

Filmography 

 1990: Unter Freunden (short)
 1996: Und morgen fängt das Leben an (TV film)
 1997: Alte Liebe, alte Sünde (TV film)
 1998: Blind Date – Flirt mit Folgen (TV film)
 1998: Zur Zeit zu zweit (TV film)
 1999: Grüne Wüste
 2002: Die Novizin (TV film)
 2005: Kebab Connection
 2006: Where Is Fred?
 2007–2014: Der Kommissar und das Meer (TV series, 7 episodes, including pilot)
 2009: The Door
 2011–2015: Reiff für die Insel (TV series, 3 episodes, including pilot)
 2014: Therapy Crashers
 2013–2018: Nord Nord Mord (TV series, 5 episodes)
 2016–2017: München Mord (TV series, 3 episodes)
 2019: Charité (TV series, 6 episodes)

External links 
 
 Anno Saul at filmportal.de
 Anno Saul at Crew United

Mass media people from Bonn
1963 births
Living people